Texas and Pacific Railroad Depot may refer to:

Texas and Pacific Railroad Depot (Bunkie, Louisiana), listed on the National Register of Historic Places in Avoyelles Parish
Texas and Pacific Railroad Depot (Natchitoches, Louisiana), listed on the National Register of Historic Places in Natchitoches Parish
Texas and Pacific Railroad Depot (Abilene, Texas)
Texas and Pacific Railroad Depot (Bonham, Texas), listed on the National Register of Historic Places in Fannin County
T&P Station, a Trinity Railway Express (commuter rail) station in Fort Worth, Texas, listed on the National Register of Historic Places in Tarrant County
Texas and Pacific Railroad Depot (Marshall, Texas), an operational Amtrak station and Texas & Pacific Railway Museum, which is part of the Ginocchio Historic District on the NRHP in Harrison County